The 51 Division is a division of the Sri Lanka Army. Established on 24 August 1995, the division is currently based in Kopay in the Northern Province. The division is a part of Security Forces Headquarters – Jaffna.

References

1995 establishments in Sri Lanka
Military units and formations established in 1995
Organisations based in Northern Province, Sri Lanka
Sri Lanka Army divisions